Marco Formentini may refer to:

 Marco Formentini (politician) (1930–2021), Italian politician
 Marco Formentini (swimmer) (born 1970), Italian swimmer